Enhwe is a kingdom made up of two main sections which are Otu Enhwe and Uluthe with its center of administration in Uluthe where the Paramount Rulers Emanates from. Enhwe Kingdom in Isoko South migrated from IDU (now Benin) during the end of the 13th Century. Its founder was Oviota Oriro, son of the third Ogiso, in the first Benin dynasty. He was denied the rights to becoming the next King. As a result of this, he ran away from Benin leaving with some loyal followers. Amongst his followers were Uvie, Ediagbon, Ekedi, Afia, Okpolo and many others. They had a brief sojourn at Jesse and later left as a result of war threats from the Oba. They found Uri, a place located in the present day Isoko South LGA. After a while, they left and settled in their present location, Uruchie, where Oviota Oriro became the first King in 1235 AD.

The second section of Enhwe known as Otu Enhwe, left Enhwe for Elele as a result of war. They later came back to Enhwe on the realisation that their relations still sojourned there. Upon their arrival, they settled at the extreme of the town, close to Igbide Kingdom.

Enhwe Kingdom has been under the administration of the Ovie as the Traditional Ruler of the Kingdom which emerges from the two ruling houses Erhebor and Evba. The Ogbaide are crowners of which their main function is to prepare the Ovie's symbol of authority (the Eri- Ivie). Since its finding,  the Enhwe Kingdom has been ruled by seventeen Kings. The present Ovie is HRM ENGR. DR. ANTHONY ONOMUEFE EFEKODHA, Former Member House of Representatives Isoko Federal Constituency and Member Nigerian Society of Engineers, Ejuzi II making him the 18th Ovie of Enhwe Kingdom.

References 

DELTA STATE LOCAL GOVERNMENT COUNCILS. Nigeria-Directory. Retrieved on 2008-05-21.

Populated places in Isoko South